Elasipodida is an order of sea cucumbers. They have numerous appendages, including conical papillae and leaf-like tentacles. Although many species are benthic, a number are pelagic, and may have their appendages modified to form sails or fins. Most members of the order inhabit deep-sea environments, such as the species of the genus Enypniastes.

Classification
The following families are recognised in the order Elasipodida: 
 family Elpidiidae Théel, 1882
 family Laetmogonidae Ekman, 1926
 family †Palaeolaetmogonidae  Reich, 2012 
 family Pelagothuriidae Ludwig, 1893
 family Psychropotidae Théel, 1882

References

Notes 

 
Echinoderm orders